Terence Ryan is a Massachusetts-based producer, singer, songwriter, instrumentalist, and engineer. In 2012, he released his first music video, "Alan’s Right" from his EP, Skeleton, followed by "Will Word and Hand", in 2015. He has most-recently shared new music videos for his singles "Mean It", and "To Live And Die in New England" which will be featured on his debut LP, Don't Panic later this month.

Life and career

Early life - 2015 

Ryan was born to and raised by working-class parents in the Boston suburb of Pembroke, MA. Not having any family members to introduce him to music, Ryan found an old keyboard that he played every day. He soon became self-taught, having also learned how to play piano, drums, guitar, and bass. By learning to play the guitar and piano, and experimenting with his laptop and BitTorrent, Ryan found his musical influences - which include Kanye West, Coldplay, Blink-182, Bon Iver and Frank Ocean - and honed his sound.

Ryan found his voice when he left his industrial warehouse job in Pembroke and headed west. Working odd jobs, couch surfing, and eventually living in his car, he would record the vocals and instrumentals on his laptop in parking lots, campgrounds, and anywhere that he could. "I so wasn't there, like, consciously. I think my subconscious was just... wanted so bad to just be a professional musician, so that's the only thing I could resort to. It was the only thing I had at the time. I didn't have money, I didn't have a place to stay, I didn't have work. So music was the only thing that I had," said Ryan.

2016 - Present
Ryan headed back east in the fall of 2016 to piece together the recordings from his time out west for his debut LP, Don’t Panic, set to release June 23, 2017.  He returned home to what was once a harder household, to one he says is now "fully recovered" and a source of inspiration for him. Don't Panic is inspired by the struggles Ryan faced growing up, as well as past experiences. According to Ryan, his career is a testament to where he came from and, through his music, he hopes to tell the stories of his friends, family, and everyone he grew up with.

On Don't Panic, Ryan says: "This whole album that's coming out is kind of based on a surprise, actually. I had signed a deal, and I thought I was finally on the track to where I wanted to be as a musician. Then I ended up moving out to California, and one bad thing turned into another and I actually ended up living in my car for a year. I would say my album comes half from that and half from coming back home and realizing how much I missed it and how much of a part of me it was."

In May 2017, Ryan released the single and music video for "Mean It" which was featured on Spotify's 'New Music Friday' playlist and exposed to the playlist's 2 million followers. Ryan's single, "To Live And Die In New England" was also released with an accompanying music video in June 2017.

Sound

"Terence blends soul, indie-rock, and big 808 drums, and channels the frustration of his every day life experiences - his warehouse job and the struggles of working-class America - into his songwriting." Drawing much influence from his working-class roots, Ryan tells the stories of the disenfranchised through his music. "Think of: Bon Iver combined with a folk version of Frank Ocean, except with more 808s."

Discography

Albums
 Don't Panic (2017)
Will Word and Hand (2015)

Singles
 Mean It  (2017)
 To Live And Die in New England  (2017)

Remixes
Dumb It Down - Bloodstreams (Terence Ryan Rework) (2012)

References

Year of birth missing (living people)
Living people
People from Pembroke, Massachusetts
Musicians from Massachusetts
21st-century American male musicians